Karl Sture Lennart Hansson (21 January 1931 – 1 March 2013) was a Swedish rower who won two medals at the European championships in 1955 and 1959, in the coxed fours and eights. He finished fourth in the eights at the 1956 Summer Olympics, and also competed at the 1960 Olympics in coxless and coxed pairs.

References

1931 births
2013 deaths
Swedish male rowers
Olympic rowers of Sweden
Rowers at the 1956 Summer Olympics
Rowers at the 1960 Summer Olympics
European Rowing Championships medalists
People from Strömstad Municipality
Sportspeople from Västra Götaland County